Chicago United Breeze is an American women's soccer team, founded in 2006. The team is a member of the Women's Premier Soccer League, the second tier of women's soccer in the United States of America and Canada. The team plays in the Midwest Conference.

The team plays its home games in the stadium on the campus of Harry D. Jacobs High School in the city of Algonquin, Illinois, 45 miles north-west of downtown Chicago. The club's colors are royal blue, white and black.

Players

Current roster

♯15    Davis, LaShaeē     forward       Chicago, IL     Harold L. Richards

Notable former players
The following former players have played at the senior international and/or professional level:
 Sylvia Gee

Year-by-year

Honors

Competition history

Coaches
  Dwayne Cruz -present

Stadia
 Stadium at Harry D. Jacobs High School, Algonquin, Illinois -present

Average attendance

External links
 Official Site
 WPSL Chicago United Breeze page

Women's Premier Soccer League teams
Women's soccer clubs in Chicago
2006 establishments in Illinois